Respect Gundam (リスペクト ガンダム) is a mini compilation of Gundam-related work created by Hiroyuki Tamakoshi, Kenki Fujioka, Tohru Fujisawa, Hiro Mashima, Minoru Sugiyama. It was published in the Gundam Magazine bundled with the November 2006 issue of Comic Bom Bom.

Works
White Impact
ten page comic by Hiroyuki Tamakoshi set in the battle of New York of the First Gundam series. His Gundam design is reminiscent of an Evangelion to symbolise the "White Devil" perceived by the Zeon forces.
Zeon Alive
one page art by Kenki Fujioka featuring a female pilot, a redesigned Zakurello with some Oggos.
Maki Levey Custom Zaku II
two page art by Tohru Fujisawa featuring original character Maki Levey and her custom Zaku II.
Hajimari ha Knight
two page art by Hiro Mashima featuring Knight Gundam characters.
Mobile Suit Gundam Explosion
fifty page comic by Minoru Sugiyama retelling the events of the Solomon battle of the First Gundam.

External links
TAMA-PRODUCTION OFFICIAL INFORMATION SITE
Kenki Fujioka homepage
Tohru Fujisawa biography page
MINORU LAND The world of art of MINORU SUGIYAMA

References

Gundam anime and manga
Hiro Mashima
Tooru Fujisawa